Fayette Township is a township in Linn County, Iowa. The township's population as of the 2020 census was 1,720.

History
Fayette Township was organized in 1841.

References

Townships in Linn County, Iowa
Townships in Iowa
1841 establishments in Iowa Territory